Sigfrid Mattsson (1917 - 2009) was a Swedish cross-country skier. Representing Skarpnäcks IF in club competitions, he won Vasaloppet in 1952.

References 

1917 births
2009 deaths
Swedish male cross-country skiers
Vasaloppet winners